Chief Sunday Adeniyi Adeyemo, popularly known as Sunday Igboho (10 October 1972, Igboho, Nigeria) is a Nigerian Yoruba self-determination activist and philanthropist. Nicknamed after his hometown, he rose to fame following his role in the Modakeke-Ife communal crisis in 1997, where he played an active part.

He is the chairman of Adeson International Business Concept Ltd. His chieftaincy title, Akoni Oodua of Yorubaland, has become famous in recent years.

He gained social media attention in January 2021 when he gave an ultimatum to Fulani herdsmen in Ibarapa to vacate the land after the killing of Dr. Aborode and enforced same. 

He is currently agitating for the freedom of the South West.

Life 
Sunday Igboho was born in Igboho, an old Oyo town, of Oke ogun in Oyo State. His father relocated the family to Modakeke in Osun state, where he grew up. He started off as a motorcycle repairer and then ventured into automobiles where he sells cars and was able to start his current Adeson business.

He gained international attention after the part he played in the Modakeke/Ife war between 1997 and 1998, where he was a defendant of Modakeke people. And thereafter relocated to Ibadan where he met former Oyo state Governor, Lam Adesina through a courageous step while trying to defend the rights of the people at a fuel station. He also went on to work with former Governor, Rasheed Ladoja and became one of his most trusted aides.

As the Akoni Oodua of Yorubaland, he is known for fighting for the rights of the Yorubas and advocating for the Oduduwa republic.

Personal life 
Igboho is a Christian. He's married with two wives and has children including three professional footballers playing in Germany.

References 

1972 births
Living people
Nigerian activists
Yoruba activists